Srivariki Premalekha is a 1984 Telugu-language romantic comedy film written, and directed by Jandhyala; and produced by Cherukuri Ramoji Rao. The story is based on a Novel titled Premalekha, published in "Chatura" magazine, written by Potturi Vijayalakshmi.

It is also commercial hit during that period, with many actors subsequently established in the cinema field. The film won a Filmfare Award South and a Nandi Award. The film was remade in Tamil as Porutham with Naresh and Poornima reprising their roles.

Plot

This comedy film revolves around a blind Love letter (Prema Lekha) written by Swarna (Poornima) to Ananda Rao (Naresh), because in a bet with her friends, she writes a blind love letter to an unknown person if the reply will come early from that boy, it will proves Swarna's theory that a boy can be easily wooed by a girl. While posting the letter she forgot to mention the from address then unknowingly her friend randomly chooses a name called Sony from a 'Sony' TV advertisement in a newspaper instead of Swarna's name in the letter and she randomly chooses a name called Ananda Rao from her brother's friends' names and sent the address to Hindustan Shipping Board after getting address from the same newspaper in another advertisement.

The destiny turns out Ananda Rao works in Hindustan shipping board Visakhapatnam. After the reading the letter he pledges to marry the girl who wrote the letter. The from address is missing is at the beginning itself he tries in various ways to find her with the help of his Maternal Uncle Suryam(Vidya Sagar) which leads to several comical circumstances and he became a joke in his backyard.

His father Parandhamayya (Suthi Veerabhadra Rao) is highly abusive and openly scolds him. He needs to gets him married soon so he arranges a match to him then Wantedly Anand Rao makes his matchmaking disastrous. Later His office colleague Margaret tries to exploit his innocence and introduces Sony (Mucherla Aruna) as that girl.

Meanwhile, after losing the bet and it was proved that her theory was wrong, she comes to Vizag for a vacation in her sister's house. Coincidentally,  Ananda Rao becomes her neighbour and they become good friends, but Swarna had started to have feelings for Anand Rao. After that, she decides to propose him for the marriage, but before that, he expresses his feelings to Sony and he says he was trying to convince his parents. Feeling dejected, Swarna went back to her village and accepts the marriage proposal on the condition that her parents give no dowry.

Anandrao's  brother Bhaskaram (Nutan Prasad) meets Sony and suspects her identity. Then he finds out the truth, as a beggar. Later he escapes from the beggars' association members who thought a new beggar came into their territory without any permission of their association.

Then after knowing all facts Bhaskaram reveals the truth in front of Ananda Rao. Actually Sony's real name is Rita, she loves a boy called Robert and her sister Margaret doesn't like their relationship, then when he is in out of station, she lies her that he died in an accident. Feeling dejected she decided to move on. After that, Margaret encourages her to love Ananda Rao. When Bhaskaram came to her house as a beggar, Robert came back home. The argument goes on with Rita and her sister. After hearing this story, Ananda Rao goes to meet her and sees her with Robert, then Rita apologies for her acts to Ananda Rao. Feeling dejected and convinced by their brother's words, he decides to marry, which his father has arranged unknown to him and the real reason for the Bhaskaram's arrival.

Here the bride is none other than Swarna. Meanwhile, Swarna decides to commit suicide because of love failure and she consumes a  diamond ring which her father had given to her for marriage. Then she saw Ananda Rao as bridegroom and misunderstands him as a fraud and angrily conveyed it to him. Then Anand Rao confesses his story to her and decides to call off the marriage. Then she tells him her story and reveals that she was Sony. Then she tells him that she consumed the diamond ring to commit suicide, because she had feelings on Anand Rao.

The tension arose, then Swarna's father says coolly that it's not a diamond ring, it's an ordinary stone shaped as a diamond, he want to manage with those stones to the bridegrooms family. After a lot of chaos, Anand Rao and Swarna finally marry and live happily ever after.

Cast

 Naresh as Ananda Rao
 Poornima as Swarna
 Suthi Veerabhadra Rao as Parandhamayya
 Nutan Prasad as Bhaskaram
 Vidyasagar as Suryam
 Sangeetha as Kamakshi
 Sri Lakshmi (actress) as Poorna
 Dubbing Janaki as Parandhamayya's wife [Ananda Rao's mother]
 S. K. Misro as Bhimudu (Parandhamayya'a gumastha)
 Melkote as Ananda Rao's Boss
 Jit Mohan Mitra as  Hanumaanlu
 Mucherla Aruna as  Sony/Rita
 Potti Prasad as Harmonium
 Rallapalli as Sarangaramudu "Saraa"
 Suthivelu as Ananda Rao (cameo appearance)
 Viswanatham as Marichembu
 Subbaraya Sharma as Purohitudu
 P. L. Narayana
 B. Chakravarthy (Jr ANR)
 Pavala Syamala

Soundtrack
 "Lipileni Kanti Baasa" (Lyrics: Veturi; Singers: S. P. Balasubrahmanyam and S. Janaki)
 "Manasa Thullipadake" (Lyrics: Veturi; Singer: S. Janaki)
 "Pelladu Pelladu" (Lyrics: Veturi; Singers: S. P. Balasubrahmanyam and S. P. Sailaja)
 "Raghuvamsa Sudha" (Lyrics: Veturi; Singers: S. P. Sailaja and S. P. Balasubrahmanyam)
 "Sarigamapadani" (Lyrics: Veturi; Singer: S. P. Balasubrahmanyam)
 "Tholisaari Mimmalni" (Lyrics: Veturi; Singer: S. Janaki)

Awards 

 Filmfare Award for Best Director – Telugu: Jandhyala
 Nandi Award for Best Editor: Gautam Raju

References

External links
 

1980s Telugu-language films
1984 films
1984 romantic comedy films
Films directed by Jandhyala
Films scored by Ramesh Naidu
Indian romantic comedy films
Telugu films remade in other languages